Caml (originally an acronym for Categorical Abstract Machine Language) is a multi-paradigm, general-purpose programming language which is a dialect of the ML programming language family.  Caml was developed in France at INRIA and ENS.

Caml is statically typed, strictly evaluated, and uses automatic memory management. OCaml, the main descendant of Caml, adds many features to the language, including an object layer.

Examples
In the following,  represents the Caml prompt.

Hello World
print_endline "Hello, world!";;

Factorial function (recursion and purely functional programming)
Many mathematical functions, such as factorial, are most naturally represented in a purely functional form. The following recursive, purely functional Caml function implements factorial:
let rec fact n = if n=0 then 1 else n * fact(n - 1);;
The function can be written equivalently using pattern matching:
let rec fact = function
  | 0 -> 1
  | n -> n * fact(n - 1);;
This latter form is the mathematical definition of factorial as a recurrence relation.

Note that the compiler inferred the type of this function to be , meaning that this function maps ints onto ints. For example, 12! is:
 # fact 12;;
 - : int = 479001600

Numerical derivative (higher-order functions)
Since Caml is a functional programming language, it is easy to create and pass around functions in Caml programs. This capability has an enormous number of applications. Calculating the numerical derivative of a function is one such application. The following Caml function  computes the numerical derivative of a given function  at a given point :
let d delta f x =
  (f (x +. delta) -. f (x -. delta)) /. (2. *. delta);;
This function requires a small value . A good choice for delta is the cube root of the machine epsilon.

The type of the function  indicates that it maps a  onto another function with the type . This allows us to partially apply arguments. This functional style is known as currying.
# let d = d (sqrt epsilon_float);;
val d : (float -> float) -> float -> float = <fun>
Note that the inferred type indicates that the replacement  is expecting a function with the type  as its first argument.
# d (fun x -> x *. x *. x -. x -. 1.) 3.;;
- : float = 26.

The function  is called a "higher-order function" because it accepts another function as an argument.
We can go further and create the (approximate) derivative of f, by applying  while omitting the  argument:
# let f' = d (fun x -> x *. x *. x -. x -. 1.) ;;
val f' : float -> float = <fun>

The concepts of curried and higher-order functions are clearly useful in mathematical programs. In fact, these concepts are equally applicable to most other forms of programming and can be used to factor code much more aggressively, resulting in shorter programs and fewer bugs.

Discrete wavelet transform (pattern matching)
# let haar l =
   let rec aux l s d = 
     match l, s, d with
       [s], [], d -> s :: d
     | [], s, d -> aux s [] d
     | h1 :: h2 :: t, s, d -> aux t (h1 + h2 :: s) (h1 - h2 :: d)
     | _ -> invalid_arg "haar" 
     in aux l [] [];;
val haar : int list -> int list = <fun>
For example:
  # haar [1; 2; 3; 4; -4; -3; -2; -1];;
   - : int list = [0; 20; 4; 4; -1; -1; -1; -1]
Pattern matching allows complicated transformations to be represented clearly and succinctly. Moreover, the Caml compiler turns pattern matches into very efficient code, at times resulting in programs that are shorter and faster than equivalent code written with a case statement (Cardelli 1984, p. 210.).

History
The first Caml implementation was written in Lisp by Ascánder Suárez in 1987 at the French Institute for Research in Computer Science and Automation (INRIA).

Its successor, Caml Light, was implemented in C by Xavier Leroy and Damien Doligez, and the original was nicknamed "Heavy Caml" because of its higher memory and CPU requirements.

Caml Special Light was a further complete rewrite that added a powerful module system to the core language. It was augmented with an object layer to become Objective Caml, eventually renamed OCaml.

See also
Categorical abstract machine
OCaml

References

Bibliography
The Functional Approach to Programming with Caml by Guy Cousineau and Michel Mauny.
Cardelli, Luca (1984). Compiling a functional language ACM Symposium on LISP and functional programming, Association of Computer Machinery.

External links
 – Caml language family

ML programming language family
Programming languages
Programming languages created in 1985